is a karate practitioner, historian, novelist and the founder of Okinawa Karate-Do Muso-Kai, as well as an author of over 11 books.

Biography 
 October 17, 1954: Kiyoshi Arakaki was born as the first son of Dr. Seiei Arakaki and Yoshiko Arakaki in Naha, the capital city of Okinawa, Japan. 
 1967: At the age of 13 Kiyoshi Arakaki was introduced to Shōshin Nagamine's Matsubayashi-ryū. 
 1973: Graduated from Naha High School, Okinawa.
 1977: Traveled to the United States.
 1977: Taught self-defense at Graceland University.
 1979: Worked for Mother Teresa's "Missionaries of Charity" in Kolkata, India
 1982: Founded Muso-Kai Karate-Do and opened his first dojo in Salt Lake City, Utah.

Philosophy 
Understand the original meaning of Okinawan Karate Kata and its names.

Spread Okinawan Karate and Okinawa Kobudo (Weapons).

Understand the correct thought and body movement of martial arts.

The Inner Physical Dynamic System (Gamaku)

Enabling Newton's Law of Motion (Force = Mass x Acceleration) to be applied to Martial Arts using isolated core muscle movements and gravity to deliver the technique.

Imaginary Center of Gravity (Balance in Unbalance)

	The Inner Physical Dynamic System is applied. Using the principles of the Inner Physical Dynamic System you can concentrate the full force of your body weight into your technique. By using isolated muscles to shift your weight you can exert overwhelming force with minimal effort to be applied to a strike, kick, throw, or to offset the opponent's center of balance regardless of size ratio.

Walking in the Martial Arts (Gravity Applied)

	Walking is free-falling to your imaginary center of gravity. Applying this principle allows you to move in any direction without your initial movement being detected. By using gravity and "falling" into your attack you can deliver much faster and more powerful techniques with minimal effort.

Activities 
Karate Seminars

Arakaki hosts seminars twice a year (May and October) in the Japanese cities of Tokyo, Osaka, and Okinawa where he works to spread his philosophy based on Okinawan Karate.	

Since its founding in 1982 Arakaki has worked to establish Muso-Kai Karate in the international community. With its headquarters in Salt Lake City, Utah, Muso-Kai Karate also has clubs in Los Angeles, Vietnam, and all over Japan.

University Lectures
 November 15, 2012 Arakaki spoke on "Karate in East" at a lecture organized by Industrial -Social Department of Ritsumeikan University. 
 May 23, 2013 Arakaki spoke on "Physical Thought of Japan and East" at a lecture organized by Industrial -Social Department of Ritsumeikan University.
 November 11, 2013 Arakaki spoke on "Karate as Methodology" at a lecture organized by Global Media Study's Department at Komazawa University.
 November 18, 2013 Arakaki spoke on "Physical Thought of Japan and East" at a lecture organized by Industrial -Social Department of Ritsumeikan University.
 November 18, 2013, Arakaki spoke about the body procedure of "Shuri-Te (Okinawan Traditional Karate)" at a lecture organized by the Normal Walk (Standard Walking) Body Institute  carried out at Ritsumeikan University Kinugasa Campus.

Bibliography
 December	1999  Killer Fist (Satsuken)
 February	2000　The Secrets of Okinawan Karate
 January	2001 	The	Secret of Okinawan Karate Part 2）         
 December	2002　The Secrets Of Okinawan Karate (Englis version)　
 May	2003  The Secret of Okinawan Karate Part 3]
 August	2004　Monkey (Story of Choki Motobu)
 March	2004　Los Secretos Del Karate De Okinawa: Esencia Y Tecnicas　(The Secrets Of Okinawan Karate  Spanish version)
 January	2006　La Potenza Segreta Del Karate Di Okinawa. Principi E Tecniche delle	Origini　(The Secrets Of Okinawan Karate Italian version)
 September	2011	The	Secret of Okinawan Karate Part 4
 December	2011 The History of Okinawan Karate-Do "The Verification of Martial Arts in the Ryukyu Kingdom Era of	Okinawa."
 2013	May　Elucidation Of Pinan or Heian ( The Explanation Of Okinawa Karate As A Method Of Martial Arts )

Filmography
 August	2013  The Essence	Of Naifanchi 
 April	2014  The Essence Of Pinan

See also
 Comparison of karate styles
 Shuri-Te
 Okinawan martial arts

References
 ^ http://ameblo.jp/kiyoshiarakaki/entry-11365717764.html
 ^ Normal walk (standard walking) body Institute
 ^The	body Procedure of Shuri-Te (Okinawan traditional Karate)
 ^ Killer	Fist (Satsuken)
 ^  The	Secrets of Okinawan Karate
 ^  The Secrets of Okinawan Karate Part 2
 ^ The Secrets Of Okinawan Karate (Essence and Techniques ) English 
 ^ The Elucidation Of Pinan or Heian ( The Explanation Of Okinawa	Karate As A Method Of Martial Arts )

External links
Okinawa Karate-Do Muso-Kai Homepage

1954 births
Living people
People from Naha
Okinawan male karateka